Pisgochaga (possibly from Quechua p'isqu bird, chaka bridge, "bird bridge") is a mountain in the northern part of the Cordillera Blanca in the Andes of Peru which reaches a height of . It is located in the Ancash Region, Corongo Province, Cusca District.

References

Mountains of Peru
Mountains of Ancash Region